Postage rate is amount charged by a postal service to transport and deliver mail. It may refer to:

 List of postal rates in the British Mandate of Palestine
 List of Ottoman postal rates in Palestine
 History of United States postage rates
 Soviet and post-Soviet postage rates